Mesogyne insignis is a species of plant in the family Moraceae. It is found in São Tomé and Príncipe and Tanzania.

References

insignis
Vulnerable plants
Taxonomy articles created by Polbot